Balinghem is a commune in the Pas-de-Calais department in the Hauts-de-France region in northern France.

Geography
A village located 10 miles (16 km) southeast of Calais, on the D228 road.

Population

Sights
 The sixteenth-century church of the Nativité-de-Notre-Dame.
 The remains of a château where Henry VIII and Francis I of France met, at the Field of the Cloth of Gold in 1520.

See also
Communes of the Pas-de-Calais department

References

External links

 A personal website of the area 
 Official Regional Tourist Office website 

Communes of Pas-de-Calais
Pale of Calais